Balabolu is a hill and an archaeological site on the hill in Mersin Province, Turkey.

Visitors follow Mut-Ermenek highway and turn north to reach the site.
The original name of the site was Adrasus (or Andrassos). Adrasus was a Roman and Byzantine town. The Battle of Andrassos in which Byzantines defeated  Hamdanid army in 960  was around Adrasus. In the 13th century the town fell to Nure Sofi of Karamanids.

The ruins
The buildings are mostly demolished. But it appears that a there was a church on top of the hill. The rock carved rooms are in the slopes. There is a cistern and a canal. The necropolis is around the hill. There are figures of animals (like lion) in some sarcophagi..

References

Mut District
Ancient Greek archaeological sites
Archaeological sites in Mersin Province, Turkey